The Serb National Board was a political organization of Serbs of Vojvodina that had formed the short-lived provinces of Serbian Vojvodina in 1848 and Banat, Bačka and Baranja in 1918. In the late nineteenth and early 20th century, in the regions of Old Serbia.

See also
Serb revolutionary organizations

Serbian revolutionary organizations
Serbian Vojvodina
20th century in Serbia
20th century in Vojvodina
Organizations established in 1848
1840s establishments in Serbia
1848 establishments in the Austrian Empire
19th century in Serbia
Serb organizations
Defunct organizations based in Serbia